The Victoria Cross Ranges ( to ) are a set of mountain ranges in the Canadian Rockies, located to the northwest of Jasper. Of the 19 peaks contained within this range, five are named after Canadian recipients of the Victoria Cross. The area of the ranges is 678 square kilometers.

This range includes the following mountains and peaks:

See also 
Ranges of the Canadian Rockies

Further reading 
 Jane G. Ferrigno, U.S. Geological Survey Professional Paper, P 269 
 Chris Yorath, Ben Gadd, Of Rocks, Mountains and Jasper: A Visitor's Guide To The Geology Of Jasper National Park, P 133 
 Brian Patton, Bart Robinson, Canadian Rockies Trail Guide, P 184

References

External links 
 Victoria Cross Ranges at Natural Resources Canada website
 The Victoria Cross Mountain Ranges: Commemorating the Heroism of Canadian Veterans
 Victoria Cross Ranges on peakvisor
 Victoria Cross Ranges on summitsearch
 Victoria Cross Ranges weather forecast

Mountain ranges of Alberta
Ranges of the Canadian Rockies